Vernon Historic District is a national historic district located in Vernon and Vernon Township, Jennings County, Indiana.  It encompasses 42 contributing buildings and 3 contributing sites in Vernon.  The district largely developed between about 1830 and 1900, and includes notable examples of Italianate, Greek Revival, and Federal style architecture. Notable contributing resources include the Jennings County Courthouse (1859), American House tavern, "Rat Row" apartments (c. 1845), Jacob Clinton House (1834), nures drug store (1853),(odd fellows lodge)(1853),Judge Hickman New House (1832), John Bassnett House (1844), Gen. Robert S. Foster House (1840), Methodist Church (1817), Vernon Presbyterian Church (1832), Baptist Church (1871), a stone arch (1832), Tunnel Mill site, and Vinegar Mill site.

It was listed on the National Register of Historic Places in 1976.

References

Historic districts on the National Register of Historic Places in Indiana
Italianate architecture in Indiana
Greek Revival architecture in Indiana
Federal architecture in Indiana
Historic districts in Jennings County, Indiana
National Register of Historic Places in Jennings County, Indiana